Alatay Nature Park is a park in Toktogul District of Jalal-Abad Region of Kyrgyzstan established in January 2016. The purpose of the park is conservation of the unique natural complexes and biodiversity, protection of rare and endangered flora and fauna, and extension of network of specially protected areas of Kyrgyz Republic. The area of the park is 56,826.4 hectares.

The nature park is situated in the western Tian Shan mountains, around the valleys of the rivers Alatay and Uzun-Akmat, northwest of the Toktogul reservoir.

References

Protected areas established in 2016
National parks of Kyrgyzstan